Montereina is a genus of sea slugs, dorid nudibranchs, shell-less marine gastropod mollusks in the family Discodorididae.

The name of this genus has been declared a temporary name. The name "Montereina" has been used by Dayrat (2010) for "all the species that belong to the metaphyletic group at the base of Discodorididae", as an alternative to naming a new genus for every species. This option was taken in order to comply with the principles of a phylogenetic nomenclature. In this sense, it is much more extensive than the hitherto monotypic genus Montereina MacFarland, 1905 (Type species Montereina nobilis MacFarland, 1905, by original designation.

Species 
 Montereina achroma (Valdés, 2001): represented as Discodoris achroma Valdés, 2001 (alternate representation)
 Montereina aliciae Dayrat, 2010: synonym of Discodorididae aliciae Dayrat, 2005
 Montereina aurea (Eliot, 1903): represented as Peltodoris aurea Eliot, 1903 (alternate representation)
 Montereina aurila (Marcus & Marcus, 1967): represented as Discodoris aurila Marcus & Marcus, 1967 (alternate representation)
 Montereina branneri (MacFarland, 1909): represented as Discodoris branneri MacFarland, 1909 (alternate representation)
 Montereina coerulescens (Bergh, 1888): represented as Discodoris coerulescens Bergh, 1888 (alternate representation)
 Montereina concinna (Alder & Hancock, 1864): represented as Discodoris concinna (Alder & Hancock, 1864) (alternate representation)
 Montereina crucis (Ørsted in Mörch, 1863): represented as Discodoris crucis (Ørsted in Mörch, 1863) (alternate representation)
 Montereina erubescens (Bergh, 1884): represented as Discodoris erubescens Bergh, 1884 (alternate representation)
 Montereina flindersi (Burn, 1962): represented as Anisodoris flindersi Burn, 1962 accepted as Diaulula flindersi (Burn, 1962) (alternate representation)
 Montereina golaia (Marcus & Marcus, 1966): represented as Discodoris golaia Marcus & Marcus, 1966 (alternate representation)
 Montereina greeleyi (MacFarland, 1909):represented as Diaulula greeleyi (MacFarland, 1909) (alternate representation)
 Montereina igla (Marcus & Marcus, 1967): represented as Peltodoris hummelincki igla Marcus & Marcus, 1967 (alternate representation)
 Montereina labifera (Abraham, 1877): represented as Discodoris labifera (Abraham, 1877) (alternate representation)
 Montereina lancei (Millen & Bertsch, 2000): represented as Peltodoris lancei Millen & Bertsch, 2000 (alternate representation)
 Montereina lentiginosa (Millen, 1982): represented as Diaulula lentiginosa (Millen, 1982) (alternate representation)
 Montereina lippa (Valdés, 2001): represented as Peltodoris lippa Valdés, 2001 (alternate representation)
 Montereina modesta (Bergh, 1877): represented as Discodoris modesta Bergh, 1877 (alternate representation)
 Montereina mortenseni (Marcus & Marcus, 1963):represented as Discodoris mortenseni Ev. Marcus & Er. Marcus, 1963 (alternate representation)
 Montereina muta (Bergh, 1877): represented as Discodoris muta Bergh, 1877 (alternate representation)
 Montereina nobilis MacFarland, 1905: represented as Peltodoris nobilis (MacFarland, 1905) (alternate representation)
 Montereina notha (Bergh, 1877): represented as Discodoris notha Bergh, 1877 (alternate representation)
 Montereina opisthidia (Bergh, 1877): represented as Discodoris opisthidia Bergh, 1877 (alternate representation)
 Montereina pallida (Baba, 1937): represented as Discodoris pallida Baba, 1937 (alternate representation)
 Montereina pardalis (Alder & Hancock, 1864): represented as Discodoris pardalis (Alder & Hancock, 1864) (alternate representation)
 Montereina paroa (Burn, 1969): represented as Discodoris paroa Burn, 1969 (alternate representation)
 Montereina phoca (Marcus & Marcus, 1967):  represented as Discodoris phoca Ev. Marcus & Er. Marcus, 1967 (alternate representation)
 Montereina punctifera (Abraham, 1877): represented as Peltodoris punctifera (Abraham, 1877) (alternate representation)
 “Montereina” purcina (Ev. Marcus & Er. Marcus, 1967) represented as Discodoris purcina Ev. Marcus & Er. Marcus, 1967 (alternate representation)
 Montereina rub]] (Bergh, 1905): represented as Discodoris rubra Bergh, 1905 (alternate representation)

References

 MacFarland F.M. (1905) A preliminary account of the Dorididae of Monterey Bay, California. Proceedings of the Biological Society of Washington, 18: 35-54
  Dayrat B. 2010. A monographic revision of discodorid sea slugs (Gastropoda, Opisthobranchia, Nudibranchia, Doridina). Proceedings of the California Academy of Sciences, Series 4, vol. 61, suppl. I, 1-403, 382 figs.

Discodorididae